The Berliner Philharmonie is a concert hall in Berlin, Germany, and home to the Berlin Philharmonic Orchestra.

The Philharmonie lies on the south edge of the city's Tiergarten and just west of the former Berlin Wall. The Philharmonie is on Herbert-von-Karajan-Straße, named for the orchestra's longest-serving principal conductor. The building forms part of the Kulturforum complex of cultural institutions close to Potsdamer Platz.

The Philharmonie consists of two venues, the Grand Hall (Großer Saal) with 2,440 seats and the Chamber Music Hall (Kammermusiksaal) with 1,180 seats. Though conceived together, the smaller hall was opened in the 1980s, some twenty years after the main building.

History 

Hans Scharoun designed the building, which was constructed over the years 1960–1963. It opened on 15 October 1963 with Herbert von Karajan conducting Beethoven's 9th Symphony. It was built to replace the old Philharmonie, destroyed by British bombers on 30 January 1944, the eleventh anniversary of Hitler becoming Chancellor. The hall is a singular building, asymmetrical and tentlike, with the main concert hall in the shape of a pentagon. The height of the rows of seats increases irregularly with distance from the stage. The stage is at the centre of the hall, surrounded by seating on all sides. The so-called vineyard-style seating arrangement (with terraces rising around a central orchestral platform) was pioneered by this building, and became a model for other concert halls, including the Sydney Opera House (1973), Denver's Boettcher Concert Hall (1978), the Gewandhaus in Leipzig (1981), Walt Disney Concert Hall in Los Angeles (2003), and the Philharmonie de Paris (2014).

Jazz pianist Dave Brubeck and his quartet recorded three live performances at the hall; Dave Brubeck in Berlin (1964), Live at the Berlin Philharmonie (1970), and We're All Together Again for the First Time (1973). Miles Davis's 1969 live performance at the hall has also been released on DVD.

On 20 May 2008 a fire broke out at the hall. A quarter of the roof suffered considerable damage as firefighters cut openings to reach the flames beneath the roof. The hall interior sustained water damage but was otherwise "generally unharmed". Firefighters limited damage using foam. The cause of the fire was attributed to welding work, and no serious damage was caused either to the structure or interior of the building. Performances resumed, as scheduled, on 1 June 2008 with a concert by the San Francisco Symphony Youth Orchestra.

Organs

Main organ 
The main organ was built by the Karl Schuke Orgelbauwerkstatt, Berlin, in 1965, and renovated in 1992, 2012 and 2016. It has four manuals and 91 stops. The pipes of the choir organs and the Tuba 16' and Tuba 8' stops are not assigned to any group and can be played from all four manuals and the pedals.

Choir organ

See also 
List of concert halls

References

External links 

 Kulturforum on Potsdamer Platz
 Berliner Philharmonie: 360° panorama (external round-tour)
 Virtual-tour through the concert hall (internal round-tour), with "stop" and "information" features

Concert halls in Germany
Buildings and structures in Mitte
Berlin Philharmonic
Music in Berlin
Berlin, Berliner Philharmonie
1963 establishments in Germany
Tourist attractions in Berlin
Modernist architecture in Germany
Music venues completed in 1963